Mark Tarlov (1952 – July 31, 2021) was an American film producer and director, attorney, speechwriter, and winemaker.

Death
Tarlov died on July 31, 2021, at his Manhattan home after battling cancer. He was 69.

Filmography
He was a producer in all films unless otherwise noted.

Film

As director

Television

References

External links

1952 births
2021 deaths
American film producers
Deaths from cancer in New York (state)